Of Love and Other Demons is a 2009 internationally co-produced drama film directed by . The film was selected as the Costa Rican entry for the Best Foreign Language Film at the 83rd Academy Awards, but it did not make the final shortlist. It is based on the novel of the same name by Gabriel García Márquez.

Cast
 Pablo Derqui as Cayetano Delaura
 Eliza Triana as Sierva María
 Jordi Dauder as Obispo
 Joaquín Climent as Marqués
 Margarita Rosa de Francisco as Marquesa
 Damián Alcázar as Abrenuncio
 Alina Lozano as Abadesa
 Martha Lucía Leal as Sor Agueda
 Carlota Llano as Martina
 Linette Hernández as Caridad

See also
 List of submissions to the 83rd Academy Awards for Best Foreign Language Film
 List of Costa Rican submissions for the Academy Award for Best Foreign Language Film

References

External links
 

2009 films
2009 drama films
Colombian drama films
Costa Rican drama films
2000s Spanish-language films
Films about exorcism
Films based on works by Gabriel García Márquez